Min-ho is a Korean masculine given name. The meaning differs based on the hanja used to write each syllable of the name. There are 27 hanja with the reading "min" and 49 hanja with the reading "ho" on the South Korean government's official list of hanja which may be used in given names. Min-ho was the ninth-most popular name for South Korean baby boys in 1980.

Entertainers
Woo Min-ho (born 1971), South Korean film director and screenwriter
Jang Min-ho (born 1977), South Korean singer
Boom (entertainer), stage name of Lee Min-ho (born 1982), South Korean rapper and television/radio personality
Lee Min-ho (born 1987), South Korean actor
Choi Min-ho (born 1991), South Korean singer, member of boy band Shinee
Lee Tae-ri (born Lee Min-ho, 1993), South Korean actor
Mino (rapper), stage name of Song Min-ho (born 1993), South Korean rapper, member of boy band Winner

Sports
Choi Min-ho (badminton) (born 1980), South Korean badminton player
Choi Min-ho (judoka) (born 1980), South Korean judoka
Kang Min-ho (born 1985), South Korean baseball catcher
Kim Min-ho (footballer, born 1985), South Korean football midfielder (K League 1)
Cheon Min-ho (born 1987), South Korean sport shooter
Cho Min-ho (born 1987), South Korean ice hockey player
Choi Min-ho (volleyball) (born 1988), South Korean volleyball player
Heo Min-ho (born 1990), South Korean triathlete
Kim Min-ho (footballer, born 1991), South Korean football forward (Singapore S.League)
Lee Min-ho (baseball) (born 1993), South Korean baseball pitcher
Kim Min-ho (footballer, born 1997) (born 1997), South Korean football defender (K League 1)

Fictional
 Cha Min-ho, main antagonist of 2017 TV series Innocent Defendant, portrayed by Um Ki-joon.
 Kang Min-ho, main antagonist of 2011 TV series 49 Days, port\/rayed by Bae Soo-bin
 Min-ho, one of the main characters of James Dashner's novel series The Maze Runner

See also
List of Korean given names

References

Korean masculine given names